Everton Football Club is an English women's association football team based in Liverpool, England, that competes in the FA Women's Super League, the top division of English women's football. Formed in 1983 as Hoylake W.F.C., it is now part of Everton F.C. and has played home games at Walton Hall Park in Walton since February 2020. The team has won the Premier League National Division once, the Premier League Cup once, and the Women's FA Cup twice.

History

Early years
The club started life as Hoylake WFC in 1983. It merged with Dolphins YC to become Leasowe, then added Pacific to its title in a sponsorship deal. In 1987–88, it came to prominence winning the North West Women's League and reaching the 1988 Women's FA Cup final, losing to Doncaster Belles 3–1. It came back the following year to beat Friends of Fulham 3–2. By 1991–92, it had won its regional league for five years running, and when the regular national competition was expanded the next season it was admitted to Division One North, promptly finishing top to join the FA Women's Premier League.

Becoming Everton

In 1995, the club became known as Everton Ladies and continued to make its mark. In 1997, it reached the final of the Premier League Cup only to lose to Millwall Lionesses 1–2. The following year, however, the team was crowned National Premier League Champions which is its biggest success to date.

In 1999 the club again lost in the League Cup final, 1–3 to Arsenal Ladies, and in 2005 reached the FA Women's Cup final only to lose 0–1 to Charlton Athletic after a disappointing display. Revenge of sorts came two years later when Everton pipped Charlton to second place in the Premier League, which as champions Arsenal had already won the UEFA Women's Cup, meant a European debut for the Toffees in 2007–08. In 2008, it won the Premier League Cup by beating Arsenal in the final. Arsenal was unbeaten in England two years at the time.

The club's first foray into UEFA competition saw it win its opening game 4–0 against Lithuanian side Gintra. It won further group games against Glentoran and Zulwil without conceding and scoring 20 goals in the process. The campaign was to end in disappointment at the second group stage. Despite beating Valur 3–1 in its final group game, Everton only finished third and failed to progress into the quarter–finals amidst much controversy.

On 10 May 2009, Everton needed only a draw against Arsenal Ladies in the last match of the season to win the Women's Premier League for only the second time in its history, but lost 1–0 to finish runners–up on goal difference. Due to the reformatting of the European Cup into the UEFA Women's Champions League, however, the team still qualified for Europe, although it had to enter at the qualifying group stages and was eliminated in round 32 by Norwegian team Roa IL. In 2010, Everton beat Arsenal 3–2 to win the FA Women's Cup with Natasha Dowie (niece of Iain) scoring the winner deep into extra time.

In 2011, the club advanced to the quarter–finals of the Champions League, where its best run so far was stopped by German side FCR Duisburg. Everton was one of eight founding teams in the FA WSL in March 2011.

Relegation to FA WSL 2 in 2014

After several seasons finishing mid-table, Everton would struggle to gain form during the 2014 season having lost key players Jill Scott and Toni Duggan (both to Manchester City) during the off-season. In September 2014, Everton would lose 2–0 to Notts County, sealing its relegation to WSL 2 after 21 years of top flight football.

FA WSL 2 (2015–2017)

Everton would contend in WSL2, registering back-to-back third-place finishes during the 2015 and 2016 seasons. In anticipation of re-aligning the season with the typical FIFA calendar, the WSL 1 and 2 competed in a truncated 9-match season. The "FA WSL Spring Series" (as it became referred), would not have teams compete for promotion or relegation before the full 2017–18 season. Everton won the Spring Series, recording 7 wins from 9 with scoring led by Claudia Walker (7 goals) and Simone Magill (5 goals). The Spring Series title was the first since the FA Women's Premier League National Division 1997–98 season title.

Return to top flight

Prior to the 2017–18 season, Notts County of the WSL 1 folded prior to the Spring Series prompting the FA to invite FA WSL 2 clubs to apply and fill the vacancy. Everton was awarded the invitation back into the top flight on 9 June 2017, and would compete in the WSL 1 for the 2017–18 season.

Everton struggled to gain much form during the 2017–18 season. Despite making a run to the semi-finals in the 2017–18 FA Women's Cup, Everton finished 9th in the table (only beating out winless Yeovil Town); however league structural changes prevented the club from being relegated.

Ahead of the 2019–20 season, the team dropped Ladies from its name. Although now simply called Everton, the club will use Everton Women in a formal capacity when necessary to avoid confusion with the men's team.

Stadium 
Everton had Rossett Park as its home ground starting in 1998, sharing with non-league side Marine A.F.C. in Crosby. Rossett Park would be the Blues' home ground for 15 years.

In 2013, the team moved to Halton Stadium (previously known then as "Select Security Stadium"), also used by its Merseyside rivals Liverpool. The move was prompted by needing improved technical requirements for the developing WSL standards and providing notably increased capacity.

Ahead of the 2018–19 season, Everton announced that it would play the first half of the season at Haig Avenue and ended up staying for the whole season.

In 2019, it was announced that the club would play its last game at the Haig Avenue on 29 September of that year before moving to Walton Hall Park but delays meant the team would not move like planned until February 2020.

Current squad

Former players

Honours
For a detailed international record see English women's football clubs in international competitions

FA WSL 2 Spring Series:
 Winners (1): 2017
FA Women's Premier League National Division:
 Winners (1): 1997–98
 Runners-up (5): 2005–06, 2006–07, 2007–08, 2008–09, 2009–10
FA Women's Cup:
 Winners (2): 1988–89 (as Leasowe Pacific), 2009–10
 Runners-up (4): 1987–88 (as Leasowe), 2004–05, 2013–14, 2019–20
FA Women's Premier League Cup:
 Winners (1): 2007–08
 Runners-up (2): 1996–97, 1998–99
FA Women's Community Shield:
 Runners-up (2): 2006–07, 2008–09
Liverpool County FA Cup:
 Winners (3): 2006, 2007, 2008'''

Managers

Player of the Season
2021 – Izzy Christiansen
2020 – Danielle Turner
2019 – Simone Magill
2018 – Angharad James
2017 – N/A
2016 – N/A
2015 – Simone Magill
2014 – Nikita Parris
2013 – Toni Duggan
2012 – Rachel Brown
2011 – Natasha Dowie
2010 – Jill Scott
2009 – Fara Williams
2008 – Lindsay Johnson
2007 – Fara Williams
2006 – Jody Handley
2002 – Fara Williams

Supporters Player of the Season
2022 – Gabby George
2021 – Izzy Christiansen
2020 – Lucy Graham
2019 – Simone Magill
2018 – Angharad James
2017 – Gabby George
2016 – Simone Magill
2015 – Danielle Turner
2014 – Nikita Parris
2013 – Toni Duggan & Lizzie Durack (tied)
2012 – Toni Duggan
2011 – Fara Williams
2010 – Fara Williams
2009 – Danielle Hill
2008 – Rachel Brown
2007 – Rachel Unitt

Young Player of the Season
2022 – Hanna Bennison
2021 – Poppy Pattinson
2020 – Molly Pike
2019 – Chloe Kelly

Spirit of the Blues award
2022 – Aurora Galli
2021 – Megan Finnigan

See also

 List of women's association football clubs in England and Wales
 Women's football in England
 List of women's association football clubs

References

External links

 Everton Ladies F.C. player profiles

 
Ladies
Football clubs in Liverpool
Women's football clubs in England
1983 establishments in England
Association football clubs established in 1983
FA WSL 1 teams
Women's Championship (England) teams
FA Women's National League teams